Kęstutis Mažeika is a Lithuanian politician. He served as Minister of Environment in the cabinet of Prime Minister Saulius Skvernelis from 4 April 2019 to 11 December 2020.

References 

Living people
Year of birth missing (living people)
Place of birth missing (living people)
21st-century Lithuanian politicians
Environment ministers of Lithuania